Terebra bellanodosa is a species of sea snail, a marine gastropod mollusk in the family Terebridae, the auger snails.

References

 Grabau A.W. & King S.G. (1928). Shells of Peitaiho. Chapter V. Common univalves or gastropods of the Peitaiho beaches. The China Journal of Science and Arts. 8(6): 320–332
 Aubry U. (1999) Nuove terebre e antichi versi. Ancona: L'Informatore Piceno. 47 pp
 Liu, J.Y. [Ruiyu] (ed.). (2008). Checklist of marine biota of China seas. China Science Press. 1267 pp.
 Grabau A.W. & King S.G. (1928). Shells of Peitaiho. Second edition. Revised and enlarged with 14 text-figures and numerous photographs of shells. Peking: The Peking Laboratory of Natural History, [vi], 281 pp., 14 text figures, 11 plates.

External links
 Coan E.V., Lutaenko K.A., Zhang J.L. [Junlong] & Sun Q.M. [Qimeng]. (2015). The molluscan taxa of A. W. Grabau & S. G. King (1928) and their types. Malacologia. 58(1–2): 179–224
 Fedosov, A. E.; Malcolm, G.; Terryn, Y.; Gorson, J.; Modica, M. V.; Holford, M.; Puillandre, N. (2020). Phylogenetic classification of the family Terebridae (Neogastropoda: Conoidea). Journal of Molluscan Studies

Terebridae
Gastropods described in 1999